São Nicolau Airport  is the domestic airport of the island of São Nicolau, Cape Verde. It is located 3 km north of the village Preguiça and about 3 km south of the island capital Ribeira Brava. The runway is 1,400 meters long and is categorized 3C.

Airlines and destinations

Statistics

See also
List of airports in Cape Verde

References

External links

Airports in Cape Verde
Ribeira Brava, Cape Verde